Cooper River Historic District is a national historic district located along the East and West Branches of the Cooper River near Moncks Corner, Berkeley County, South Carolina. It encompasses 32 contributing buildings, 77 contributing sites, 8 contributing structures, and 4 contributing objects and is a remarkably intact historic and cultural landscape. The district includes many historic buildings, structures, and objects from the 18th, 19th, and 20th centuries and archaeological remains of settlements, machines, barns, and other structures that supported agricultural activity. In addition, there are landscape features dating to the 18th and 19th centuries such as rice fields, banks, canals, dams, reservoirs or reserves, causeways, roads, avenues, upland fields, fence lines, and cemeteries.

It was listed in the National Register of Historic Places in 2002.

References

Historic districts on the National Register of Historic Places in South Carolina
Colonial architecture in South Carolina
Buildings and structures in Berkeley County, South Carolina
National Register of Historic Places in Berkeley County, South Carolina